Nathan Ellis (born 22 September 1994) is an Australian cricketer. He made his international debut for the Australia cricket team in August 2021. He became the first cricketer to take a hat-trick on his debut in a Twenty20 International (T20I) match.

Career
In September 2018, Ellis was named in the Hobart Hurricanes' squad for the 2018 Abu Dhabi T20 Trophy. He made his Twenty20 debut for the Hobart Hurricanes in the 2018 Abu Dhabi T20 Trophy on 5 October 2018. He made his List A debut for Tasmania, on 23 September 2019, in the 2019–20 Marsh One-Day Cup. He made his first-class debut on 24 February 2020, for Tasmania in the 2019–20 Sheffield Shield season.

In June 2021, Ellis was named as a travelling reserve player for Australia's Twenty20 International (T20I) series against Bangladesh. Prior to the tour, Ellis was moved up to Australia's full squad, covering for Riley Meredith.

Ellis made his T20I debut on 6 August 2021, for Australia against Bangladesh. In the match, Ellis took a hat-trick, to become the first cricketer to take a hat-trick on debut in a T20I match.  He became the third Australian cricketer to achieve a hat-trick in a T20 International, after Brett Lee and Ashton Agar. Later the same month, Ellis was named as one of three players as injury cover in Australia's squad for the 2021 ICC Men's T20 World Cup.

In February 2022, he was bought by the Punjab Kings in the auction for the 2022 Indian Premier League tournament. Later the same month, Ellis was named in Australia's One Day International (ODI) squad for their tour of Pakistan. He made his ODI debut on 29 March 2022, for Australia against Pakistan.

In March 2022, Ellis was signed by the Hampshire Hawks for the 2022 Vitality Blast season in England.

References

External links
 

1994 births
Living people
Australian cricketers
Australia One Day International cricketers
Australia Twenty20 International cricketers
Hobart Hurricanes cricketers
Tasmania cricketers
Twenty20 International hat-trick takers
Punjab Kings cricketers
Hampshire cricketers
London Spirit cricketers
Australian expatriate sportspeople in England